The men's team pursuit race of the 2013–14 ISU Speed Skating World Cup 2, arranged in the Utah Olympic Oval, in Salt Lake City, United States, was held on November 16, 2013.

The Dutch team – comprised by Jan Blokhuijsen, Koen Verweij and Sven Kramer – won, setting a new world record, while the American team came second, and the South Korean team came third.

Results
The race took place on Saturday, November 16, in the afternoon session, scheduled at 15:46.

References

Men team pursuit
2